The Land Before Time V: The Mysterious Island is a 1997 direct-to-video animated adventure musical film produced and directed by Charles Grosvenor. This is the first film in the series to be directed by Grosvenor, as well as the first film in which Anndi McAfee voices Cera, Aria Noelle Curzon voices Ducky, and Miriam Flynn voices Grandma Longneck. It is also the only film in which Brandon LaCroix plays Littlefoot; it is the first in which Thomas Dekker provides the singing voice for Littlefoot. Three songs for the film were written by Michele Brourman and Amanda McBroom, with music composed by Michael Tavera and the London Symphony Orchestra.

Plot 
One day, a swarm of "leaf-gobblers" descends upon the Great Valley, devouring all plants and reducing it to a barren wasteland. The inhabitants of the Great Valley have no choice but to find another place where they can survive until the plants have grown back. However, the leaf-gobblers have left a path of devastation behind them, leaving no food for the dinosaurs to find. After searching for many days, tension enters the group as Cera's father and Littlefoot's grandfather argue over changing their course, beginning a fight between Littlefoot and Cera. The fight immediately breaks up when Cera's father announces that every herd should go its own way the next morning. Not wanting to be separated, Littlefoot leads his friends off in the night, in the hope they can find food before they are caught. They leave a trail for the grownups to follow, and eventually reach the "Big Water". Disheartened by the undrinkable water, the children spy a verdant island connected to the mainland by a thin land bridge. On their way, an earthshake occurs, which creates a tsunami from which they narrowly escape. They quickly tuck in to the plentiful bounty of the island, but are then horrified to discover the tsunami has destroyed the land bridge.

Isolated on the island, they try out Cera's idea to return by using a log as a boat. The plan initially works well, but Cera is suffering seasickness and Petrie is too terrified of the Big Water to act as lookout. However, a swimming sharptooth attacks, and in the confusion and fright which follows, they end up on the island again. That night, they remember their families, while the herd, having followed the trail, sleep on the shores of the beach on the mainland, worrying for them while Cera's father blames their leave on Littlefoot.

The next morning, the children wake up to the shadow of a Sharptooth, only to find that it is Chomper, the young Sharptooth who hatched in their care before returning to his parents in the second film. Since then, Chomper has learned how to speak. Chomper takes them to a safe refuge to hide from his parents. Unaware of Chomper and the others, another sharptooth has been living on the island and begins hunting down the children. Afterwards, Ducky is captured by a Pterodactylus, but manages to escape before she can come to any harm. Chomper hides the children in odorous plants, and provides them with leafy food upon their request. However, an overcautious Cera openly displays distrust to Chomper, leaving him heartbroken as he departs in tears. Littlefoot follows him and apologizes, but he is interrupted by Chomper's mother. She nuzzles him, then leaves. Littlefoot is intrigued by her display of love to Chomper.

As Littlefoot went back to the hideout, the Giganotosaurus from earlier finds and chases the children towards a cliff above the big water. Chomper tries to help, but is overcome by the Sharptooth. His parents come to the rescue on Chomper (and the same thing for the kids) and battle the Sharptooth near the edge of the island, during which he falls into the Big Water and takes Chomper with him, much to his parents' shock. Littlefoot plunges in to save Chomper while the Sharptooth is swept away by the current. Another swimming Sharptooth appears, but this time they discovered a plesiosaur named Elsie who then saves them both from drowning. She returns them to the island, where Chomper's grateful parents promise never to eat the children; Chomper's father grudgingly admits that, after sniffing Spike (who had eaten some of the foul-smelling hideout), anything that smelt that bad wouldn't taste very good anyway. Chomper's mother also nuzzles Littlefoot, in gratitude for his actions to save Chomper from drowning. Cera realises her mistake and accepts that not all Sharpteeth are so bad and monstrous as she thought. Elsie offers to take them across the sea, so Chomper and his parents happily bid them farewell, promising that they will see each other again. When they get back on the mainland, they find that the herd found a lush, green, little sanctuary on the shore where they can stay until the Great Valley has become fertile again. As the credits roll, the film shows when the Great Valley did, the herd returns home.

Voice cast

 Brandon LaCroix as Littlefoot (speaking voice)
 Thomas Dekker as Littlefoot (singing voice)
 Anndi McAfee as Cera
 Aria Curzon as Ducky
 Jeff Bennett as Petrie / Mr. Clubtail  
 Rob Paulsen as Spike   
 Cannon Young as Chomper
 Kenneth Mars as Grandpa Longneck
 Miriam Flynn as Grandma Longneck
 Christina Pickles as Elsie
 John Ingle as Narrator / Cera's Father
 Tress MacNeille as Ducky's Mother / Petrie's Mother

Songs

Release

 December 9, 1997 (VHS and laserdisc)
 December 9, 1998 (VHS and laserdisc, the last laserdisc release - Universal Family Features)
 December 4, 2001 (VHS) 
 April 1, 2003 (DVD)
 December 5, 2003 (VHS and DVD - 4 Movie Dino Pack (Volume 2) and 9 Movie Dino Pack)
 February 8, 2005 (DVD - 2 Great Movies Featuring Chomper)

Reception 

Denise Lanctot of Entertainment Weekly gave the film an "A" and praised the "first-class orchestral score" and its "tail-thumping" songs. Aria Curzon received an award for "Outstanding Young Voice-Over" at the 23rd Young Artist Awards in 2002 for her role as Ducky in this film, as well as The Land Before Time VI, The Land Before Time VII, and The Land Before Time VIII.

References

External links 
 

1997 direct-to-video films
1997 animated films
1997 films
The Land Before Time films
Direct-to-video sequel films
Films directed by Charles Grosvenor
1990s English-language films
Universal Animation Studios animated films
Universal Pictures direct-to-video animated films
Films scored by Michael Tavera
1990s American animated films
Animated films about dinosaurs
1990s children's animated films